Boehlert is a surname. Notable people with the surname include:

Eric Boehlert (1965–2022), American writer 
Sherwood Boehlert (1936–2021), American politician

See also
Böhler (surname)